Boria may refer to:

People
Juan Boria (1906–1995), Puerto Rican poet
Boria Sax (born 1949), American author and teacher
Boria (footballer) (born 1962), Spanish footballer

Places
Boria, Poland
Boria Bal, a village in Afghanistan
Boria, a village in Jam Kandorana, Gujarat, India

Other uses
Boria (caste) a Hindu caste found in North India
Boria (theatre),  a form of ethnic Malays theatre, originated from the community in Penang
Boron trioxide

See also
Borias
Borija (disambiguation)